"Route 246" (pronounced "route two forty-six") is a song recorded by Japanese idol girl group Nogizaka46. It was released digitally on July 24, 2020, through N46Div. and Sony Music Records. It was written by Yasushi Akimoto and composed by Tetsuya Komuro. Asuka Saitō served as the center position of the song.

Background and release

On July 16, 2021, Nogizaka46 announced the new single "Route 246" for release on July 24, to digital music and streaming platforms exclusively, two months after "Sekaijū no Rinjin yo", a charity single for tribute to hospital workers and people during the COVID-19 pandemic. The center position of the song is served by Asuka Saitō. The full song was aired for first time at the radio show Nogizaka46's All Night Nippon on July 22. 

"Route 246" is the first song composed and arranged by Tetsuya Komuro since his retirement from the music industry in January 2018 with the last composed song "Kaze yo Fuke!" by Last Idol. It is also the first song that Yasushi Akimoto and Komuro worked together after about a decade.

Composition

"Route 246" is described as an EDM song with the concept of "friendship", written by Yasushi Akimoto and composed by Tetsuya Komuro in the key of G minor, 125 beats per minute with a running time of 3 minutes and 52 seconds.

Commercial performance

For the dated issue of August 3, 2020, "Route 246" entered Oricon Combined Singles Chart at number 13, and Digital Singles at number 4 with 33,391 downloads. The song debuted at number 10 on the Billboard Japan Hot 100 with 35,785 downloads (number 4 on the Download Songs), and 1,713,416 streams (number 43 on the Streaming Songs).

Music video

The one-minute-and-thirteen-second music video teaser of "Route 246" was released on July 23, 2021, one day before the single release. The full music video was included on the group's video album All MV Collection 2: Ano Toki no Kanojotachi, released on September 9. With the concept "current Tokyo", the music video was produced by Maxilla, a creative team who produced the group's music video "I See…", shot at Ōsanbashi Pier, Yokohama, and various places in Tokyo in early July.

Live performance

Nogizaka46 performed "Route 246" for the first time at TV Asahi's Music Station 3.5 Hours SP on the release date, as well as TBS's CDTV Live! Live! on August 8, Nippon TV's Buzz Rhythm 02 on August 21, and Fuji TV's 2020 FNS Music Fes. Summer on August 26. At year-end music shows, they performed the song at Music Station Ultra Super Live 2020 on December 25, and 71st NHK Kōhaku Uta Gassen on December 31.

Participating members

First generation: Manatsu Akimoto, Erika Ikuta, Asuka Saitō , Kazumi Takayama, Minami Hoshino, Sayuri Matsumura
Second generation: Hinako Kitano, Mai Shinuchi, Miona Hori
Third generation: Reka Iwamoto, Minami Umezawa, Momoko Ōzono, Shiori Kubo, Mizuki Yamashita, Yūki Yoda
Fourth generation: Sakura Endō, Haruka Kaki, Ayame Tsutsui

Charts

Weekly charts

Year-end charts

Certifications

Release history

References

External links
 

2020 singles
2020 songs
Japanese-language songs
Nogizaka46 songs
Songs with lyrics by Yasushi Akimoto